Olivia Nobs (born 18 November 1982 in La Chaux-de-Fonds) is a Swiss snowboarder. Nobs captured the silver medal in snowboard cross at the FIS Snowboarding World Championships 2009 in South Korea.

At the 2010 Vancouver Winter Olympics, Nobs took the bronze in the Women's Snowboard Cross.

References 
 Official website
 FIS-Ski.com Biography/Results

Swiss female snowboarders
Olympic snowboarders of Switzerland
Olympic bronze medalists for Switzerland
Snowboarders at the 2006 Winter Olympics
Snowboarders at the 2010 Winter Olympics
1982 births
Living people
Olympic medalists in snowboarding
Medalists at the 2010 Winter Olympics
People from La Chaux-de-Fonds
Sportspeople from the canton of Neuchâtel
21st-century Swiss women